Vortex power is a form of hydro power which generates energy by placing obstacles in rivers and oceans to cause the formation of vortices which can then be tapped into a usable form of energy such as electricity. This method is pioneered by a team at the University of Michigan who call the technology VIVACE or Vortex Induced Vibrations Aquatic Clean Energy.

The company Vortex Hydro Power has been created to commercialize the technology. This technology has an expected life span of 10-20 years, which could meet life cycle cost targets.

Environmental impacts 
As of right now, this technology seems to be nonpolluting and low maintenance. In addition, it does not have any major impact on wildlife such as fish or other animals. This form of power is still in the developmental research stage and is currently undergoing optimization experiments before it can be implemented.

See also

Hydropower
Renewable energy
Vortex induced vibration

References 

 Vortex Power, University of Michigan

External links

DWCPA Currents - August 2007
Michigan Daily - Prof. turns vibrations into electricity

Water power
University of Michigan